Zu Hai (born May 10, 1976) is a Chinese singer.

Biography
Zu was born in Bengbu, Anhui in 1976, her father is an electrician.

During her childhood years, Zu developed an interest in singing, dancing and experimented with several different vocal techniques after listening to the songs of popular female singers such as Li Guyi and Teresa Teng.

Zu attended Bengbu Fourth High School in 1991. She entered University in China Conservatory of Music in 1999 and she joined the Chinese People's Liberation Army Naval Song and Dance Troupe in 2003.

References

External links

1976 births
Living people
People from Bengbu
China Conservatory of Music alumni
21st-century Chinese women singers